A wordsmith is a writer.

Wordsmith may also refer to:

 WordSmith (software), a collection of corpus linguistics tools
 Wordsmith (TV series), an instructional television series
 Wordsmith.org, a linguistics website founded by Anu Garg
 The Wordsmith, a 1979 Canadian television film directed by Claude Jutra
 Kenny Wordsmith or Ashok Rajagopalan, Indian children's book author and illustrator